Rosa Chanovsky, better known as Rosa Dubovsky (ca. 1885, Russia - 1972, in Buenos Aires, Argentina) was a Russian-born feminist activist and militant anarchist in Argentina.  She is remembered for her involvement with the  Argentine Regional Workers' Federation (FORA), and for founding the Emma Goldman Library.

Biography
Rosa Chanovsky was born into a Jewish family in tsarist Russia. In 1905, her husband Alfred Dubovsky, became involved in riots which led up to the  1905 Russian Revolution, driven by the Bolsheviks. It was here that she became involved in the anarchist movement. Both escaped from Russia to Turkey, and from there, she to France, and he to Buenos Aires. In 1907, they reunited in Rosario, Santa Fe. Dubovsky worked as a hat maker, while her husband worked for the railway. She was linked to organizing women's groups with the militant anarchist movement in Argentina.  Here, she founded the Emma Goldman Library, specializing in women's issues. In the early 1900s, she helped organize women match factory workers. With the Coups d'état in Argentina of 1930, Dubovsky, her husband, and their six children fled to Buenos Aires where her husband died in 1934. Dubovsky's work shifted to the upholstery industry. She affiliated with FORA and the Argentine Libertarian Federation until her death in 1972. Her daughter, Sara, was also involved in the women's anarchist movement.

References

Bibliography

1880s births
1972 deaths
Argentine women's rights activists
Argentine anarchists
Argentine feminists
Argentine people of Russian-Jewish descent
Russian and Soviet emigrants to Argentina
Upholsterers
Women librarians
Argentine librarians
Women carpenters
Anarcha-feminists
Organization founders
Women founders